Reverend John Mavor  is an Australian minister of religion. He was the 8th president of the  Uniting Church in Australia, serving in that role from 1997 to 2000.

He was accepted as a candidate for the Methodist Church of Australasia in 1954. Mavor worked for the Queensland Synod as director of Mission and Parish Services, then as the Moderator of the Synod from 1988 to 1989. He was President of the Assembly for a three-year term from 1998 to 2000. He later worked as a project officer for Uniting International Mission then acting National Director for 15 months. He retired in April 2007.

He was conferred membership of the Order of Australia in the 1999 Australia Day Honours.

References

Further reading

Uniting Church in Australia presidents
Members of the Order of Australia
Living people

Year of birth missing (living people)
People educated at Brisbane State High School